George Dow (1907–1987) was a British railway employee and historian.

George Dow may also refer to:

George Francis Dow (1868–1936), American antiquarian
George P. Dow (1840–1910), American civil war Union army sergeant
George Augustus La Dow (1826–1875), American politician from Oregon
George Dow, the plaintiff in the United States Supreme Court case Dow v. United States